The John Knap House, also known as Samuel Knap House, is a historic house at 984 Stillwater Road in Stamford, Connecticut.  The house is a -story wood-frame structure, five bays wide, with a large central chimney.  It was built c. 1705 by a Capt. John Knap and was owned by his son, Lt. John Knap.  The house was bought from the Lt. John Knap's estate by his son Samuel Knap in 1765.  It is believed to be the second oldest house in Stamford.

The house was listed on the National Register of Historic Places in 1979.

See also
National Register of Historic Places listings in Stamford, Connecticut

References

External links

Houses on the National Register of Historic Places in Connecticut
Historic American Buildings Survey in Connecticut
Houses completed in 1705
Houses in Stamford, Connecticut
National Register of Historic Places in Fairfield County, Connecticut
1705 establishments in Connecticut